Null cells are large granular lymphocytes that develop inside the bone marrow and attack pathogens and abnormal cells. These cells do not have receptors like one would typically find on either mature B cells or T cells. There are common characteristics that null cells lack to be categorized into surface markers in mature B-cells and T-cells. Null cells are, in fact, T cells that fail to express CD2. Even though they are large granular lymphocytes, they are still relatively small, chromophobic cells. When the term chromophobic is used, it means when viewed under a light microscope. These cells appear to be small. Null cells are present in small numbers in lymphoid organs but are often found in nonlymphoid tissues. While they do not contain known anterior pituitary hormones in their cytoplasm, they do contain secretory granules that may contain various properties like; hormone pieces, forerunners, or biologically inactive substances. These cells are seen as a representation of resting cells, precursors of various cell types, or an unknown cell type. 

Null cells account for a small proportion of the lymphocytes found in an organism. They are quick to act in the presence of pathogens like viruses and attack viral-infected or tumor cells in a  non-MHC-restricted manner. The number of null cells has increased over time in subpopulations of mononuclear cells. Mononuclear cells are blood cells that have a round and single nucleus like lymphocytes and monocytes. They are called peripheral blood mononuclear cells (PBMC) when isolated from circulating blood. However, they are found elsewhere, like the umbilical cord, spleen, and bone marrow. With null cells increasing during an immune response, the changes are believed to be due to defects involved with an aging immune system and can be used as a representation of a healthy immune system in the healthy aged group, which is linked to survival. 

Null cells are in small numbers in lymphoid organs but are often found in nonlymphoid tissues. The accumulation of lymphoid subsets in various tissues is a result of several mechanisms. The first mechanism if inside an organ is regulated by the interaction of adhesion molecules with endothelial cells and lymphocytes; the second is named the 'transit' of lymphocytes through the organ's parenchyma; and finally, the mechanism's last step is directly into the blood or lymph vessels. The transit phase is critical as the lymphocytes can undergo programmed cell death (apoptosis) or be activated to start proliferation. This gives the number of lymphocytes found in any organ at any time. 

Lymphocytes will mature both phenotypically and functionally for a time after birth. Null lymphocytes will steadily decrease while having a linked increase in T and B lymphocytes from 56 days of gestation to 8 weeks old. When using a cell line made by cloning an original white blood cell (monoclonal antibodies), there is evidence for recirculation of lymphocytes, particularly in null-cell subsets found from the bronchoalveolar spaces back into regional draining lymph nodes.

Null cells have also been found in some cancers. In the pituitary gland, null cell adenomas have been found. These non-functioning tumors and adenomas have null cells comprising around 20% of them. Null cells have also been identified in the nontumorous adenohypophysis, suggesting that null cell adenomas are derived from preexisting benign null cells.

References

External links
 

Cell anatomy
Histology